Whitehall is an unincorporated community located in Livingston Parish, Louisiana, United States. The community is on Louisiana Highway 22 and Maurepas lies approximately two miles to the northeast. The Amite River flows past the northwest side of the community.

References

Unincorporated communities in Livingston Parish, Louisiana
Unincorporated communities in Louisiana